Bonnie Shemie (born May 10, 1949) is an author and illustrator who has written educational books for children including a series about Native American dwellings. She was born in the U.S. and lives in Canada.

Her writing highlights pre-modern construction techniques as well as the belief systems and natural forces related to them.

Life and career
Shemie (née Brenner) was born on May 10, 1949, in Cleveland, Ohio to parents William and Louise Brenner. She studied architecture in the United States before moving to Montreal, Canada, in 1972. In 1974, she married Milo Shemie. From 1973 to 1976, she worked as a graphic designer and illustrator for advertising agencies in Montreal. She went on to pursue a career as a freelance illustrator, and later as an author and illustrator of children's books.

Shemie's Native Dwellings series started with the book, Houses of Snow, Skin and Bones: Native Dwellings, the Far North, published in 1989. The book was aimed at children and contained detailed descriptions of the homes built by Inuit tribes in Alaska. The work was praised and Noel McDermott in Canadian Children's Literature called it "a well-written and beautifully illustrated book, in which carefully researched information is presented, clearly and accurately and without any tendency to eulogize or romanticize."

Shemie's book Houses of China was described as "excellent". Her book Houses of Hide and Earth was described as accessible and appealing while Shemie's research for her books was lauded.

Selected works

Native Dwellings series
 Houses of Snow, Skin and Bones (1989) - 
Houses of Bark: Tipi, Wigwam and Longhouse (1990) - 
 Houses of Wood (1992) - 
Houses of Hide and Earth
Mounds of Earth and Shell

Others
Houses of China (1996) - 
 Building Canada (2001) - 
Building America by Janice Weaver (2002) -  (Illustrator)

References 

1949 births
Living people
American architectural historians
American non-fiction children's writers
American women illustrators
American children's book illustrators
20th-century Canadian women writers
American emigrants to Canada
20th-century Canadian women artists
Canadian women children's writers
Canadian women illustrators
Canadian children's book illustrators